X61 is the name of the Alstom Coradia Nordic railcar which was ordered by Skånetrafiken, the regional public transport organisation in Scania (Sweden), operate 99 X61 trainsets, of which the first batch of 49 trainsets were delivered 2009–2011. An additional 20 trainsets was ordered in 2011 and in 2017 further 30 trainsets was ordered. The interior of the X61 is better suited for the often longer distances covered by regional trains, with toilets (which the SL X60 commuter trains do not have) and more comfortable seats. Östgötatrafiken (the public transport organisation in Östergötland) has bought 5 trains of type X61, delivered in 2010, and has ordered eight more, which was delivered 2015. Västtrafik (the public transport organisation in Västra Götaland) has bought 22 X61 trains.

References 

Multiple units of Sweden
Alstom Coradia